Góra Pomorska is a non-operational PKP railway station on the disused PKP rail line 230 in Góra Pomorska (Pomeranian Voivodeship), Poland.

Lines crossing the station

References 
 Góra Pomorska article at Polish Stations Database , URL accessed at 19 March 2006

Disused railway stations in Pomeranian Voivodeship
Railway stations in Pomeranian Voivodeship
Wejherowo County